Batam is the largest city in the province of Riau Islands, Indonesia. The city administrative area covers three main islands of Batam, Rempang, and Galang (collectively called Barelang), as well as several small islands. Batam Island is the core urban and industrial zone, while both Rempang Island and Galang Island maintain their rural character and are connected to Batam Island by short bridges.

According to Statistics Indonesia's 2020 census, Batam had a population of 1,196,396, making it the third largest city in the region of Sumatra, after Medan and Palembang. It is the closest part of Indonesia to Singapore, at a minimum land distance of 5.8 km. During the 2010 national census, Batam was the fastest-growing municipality in Indonesia the decade prior, with a population growth rate of 11% per year. In 2017, the island suffered severe job losses; some 300,000 workers were laid off.

History 

The first recorded inhabitants at Batam Island are Malays known as Orang Laut, from the year 231 AD. The island that once served as the field of struggle of Admiral Hang Nadim against the invaders was used by the government in the 1960s as a petroleum logistics base on Sambu Island.

In the 1970s, according to Presidential Decree number 41 year 1973, Batam Island was designated as a working environment of an industrial area supported by Batam Island Industrial Development Authority or better known as Batam Authority Board (BOB, now Batam Development Board ( or BP Batam) as the driving force for the development of Batam, with the initial aim of making Batam the "Indonesian version of Singapore". With the rapid development of the island, based on Government Regulation No. 34 of 1983, the Batam District (which is part of Riau Islands Regency) was upgraded to municipality status which has the duties in running government administration and society and support the development of BP Batam.

In the Reformation era in the late 1990s, with Act No. 53 of 1999, the Batam administrative municipality changed its status to an autonomous region, namely Batam City Government to carry out governmental and developmental functions by involving BP Batam.

Geography 
Batam is a roughly oval island with many bays, islets, and peninsulas, located west of Bintan Island, south of Singapore, north of Rempang and Galang, and east of Bulan Island. The Singapore Strait separates Singapore and Batam, while the Riau Strait separates Batam and Bintan. Batam Municipality covers 3,990 km², of which 1,040 km² is land, a figure which includes some land reclamation. However, Barelang Island (not actually one but three, see above) covers roughly 715 km² of that 1,040 km², and Batam island itself covers only about 410 km² out of the total. The bulk of the municipal population resides on Batam Island.

Climate
Batam has a tropical rainforest climate (Af) with heavy rainfall year-round.

Governance

Mayor 
The Batam city government takes care of all population administration and civil registration as well as human resources. The current mayor is Muhammad Rudi who has served since 2016, accompanied by Amsakar Ahmad as deputy mayor.

Batam Development Board (BP) 
The Agency for Free Trade Zone and Free Port of Batam, often abbreviated as BP Batam, is a government nonstructural body under the Chairmanship of the Board of Regions (DK) Batam Central Government, which is chaired by a Coordinating Minister for Economic Affairs. BP Batam plays a role in land governance and investment in the Special Economic Zone (SEZ) of Batam.

Administrative divisions 

Batam city is divided into twelve districts (kecamatan) – which include several adjacent islands such as Bulan, Rempang and Galang, as well as Batam Island itself. The whole municipality is thus often known by the abbreviation of Barelang. The districts are tabulated below with their areas, 2010 census populations and 2020 census populations, together with the number of administrative villages within that district and its postal codes.

Notes:
 1 comprises 116 islands to the west of Batam Island.
 2 comprises 70 islands to the southwest of Batam Island
 3 comprises 82 islands to the south of Batam Island, including Galang Island and Rempang Island.
 4 comprises the east part of Batam Island, but also includes 23 islands off the eastern shore.
 5 includes 14 islands off the coast of Batam Island.

Demographics 
At the 2020 census, Batam had a population of 1,196,396 inhabitants. The population was increasing rapidly, with a population growth rate of more than 8% per year between 2001 and 2012, but has subsequently diminished.

Ethnicity 

Today, Batam is inhabited by a heterogeneous mixture of people due to labor migration and desire to be close to Singapore; it is very diverse, two-thirds of the population are migrants. The predominant ethnicities are Malays, Javanese, Batak, Minangkabau, and Chinese. As a municipality it exemplifies the national motto of "Bhinneka Tunggal Ika" (Unity in Diversity). The location of Batam, which is close to Singapore, is conducive to the development of economic, sociopolitical, and cultural aspects of the local community.

Religion 

Islam is the majority religion in Batam, followed by Christians, Buddhists and Hindus. Most of those who follow Islam are Javanese, Malays and Minangkabaus. The Great Mosque of Batam, located in the city center adjacent to the main square, the mayor's office and the provincial Parliament, is an important symbol of Islamic religious life in Batam. Christianity is also widely embraced by people of Batam, especially those from the Batak people of Sumatra and migrants from Flores also from East Indonesia. The majority of the Chinese population practises Buddhism. A number of Viharas are located in Batam, of which Vihara Duta Maitreya is one of the most frequented, and is the largest Vihara in Southeast Asia with an area of 4.5 hectares.

Language 
Indonesian is the common lingua franca of Batam in daily use. Other languages such as local Malay (similar to the Malaysian standard as spoken in neighbouring Malaysia and Singapore), Minangkabau, Batak, Javanese, and Chinese ethnic dialects like Hokkien and Teochew are also used. The usage of Mandarin and English are trending due to Singaporean influence, especially by expatriates living in Batam.

Economy 

Based on Presidential Decree No. 41/1973, the Batam Industrial Development Authority (BP Batam) was established to manage 415 square kilometer industrial complex in Batam City for heavy industry. Previously only Pertamina, the Indonesian state oil company, settled there with only 6,000 inhabitants.
Shipbuilding and electronics manufacturing are important industries on the island. Being located close to the ports of Singapore, the speed of goods shipping and product distribution is increased, benefiting the island's economy. With lower labor costs and special government incentives, it is the site of many factories operated by foreign companies.

Under a framework signed in June 2006, Batam, along with parts of neighbouring Bintan and Karimun, are a part of a Special Economic Zone with Singapore; this zone eliminates tariffs and value-added taxes for goods shipped between Batam and Singapore. In 2007, Law No. 44 was enacted to supplement Law No. 36/2000 in establishing Batam as a free trade zone for 70 years. BP Batam still manage the industrial complex. And in 2016, responsibility of industrial complex changed from the governor of Riau Islands Province to the Office of the Coordinating Economic Minister as per Presidential Decree No. 8/2016.

Over 1.5 million tourists visited the city in 2015. Batam is the third-busiest entry port to Indonesia next to Bali and Jakarta. In 2014, around 58.8% of foreign tourists came from Singapore, 12.8% from Malaysia and 4.2% from South Korea.

Transport

Ferry 

Ferries connect Batam to Singapore, Bintan, and Johor Bahru (Malaysia). Five ferry terminals are on the island: Batam Harbour Bay Ferry Terminal, Nongsapura Ferry Terminal, Sekupang, Waterfront City, and Batam Center Ferry Terminal. Connections to Singapore are by way of Harbourfront and Tanah Merah Ferry Terminals run by Singapore Cruise Centre (SCC).

The most recent incident happened on 29 November 2015 when a ferry, 'Sea Prince', hit floating object(s) while en route to Singapore from Batam and began leaking. A total of 97 passengers were rescued on life rafts.

Signs showing a picture of a raised finger over a pair of lips have been placed in August 2014 at the Batam Centre International Ferry Terminal to request silence while queuing for immigration to hear names being called and clearly hear instructions given by the immigration officer. Some visitors have been sent back immediately on the first ferry available for flouting this rule. The signs are also applicable at other terminals, but are not strictly enforced.

Trans Batam 

 Trans Batam is the most reliable and the cheapest public transportation in Batam. It began to operate in 2005. Trans Batam is the second BRT system in Indonesia, after Jakarta's TransJakarta. The price for one ride is Rp2,000 for students and Rp4,000 for the public. Trans Batam operates from 05:30 to 19:00.

Trans Batam serves eight corridors of route:

Taxi 
 Taxis in Batam are available almost anywhere, at ferry terminals, the airport, shopping malls, hotels, etc. More than 3000 taxis are in Batam. In the early 2000s, Batam commonly had Toyota Corolla taxis. Starting in late 2013, more than 95% of taxis are brand new using the Toyota Limo and Chevrolet Lova.

Airport 
Hang Nadim International Airport is the island's main airport, and has the longest runway of all airports in Indonesia. The airport was the largest airport in the Sumatra region from 1995 to 2012 with a capacity of six million passengers annually, and is now the second-largest in the Sumatra region after Kuala Namu International Airport in Medan, which has a capacity of eight million passengers. The airport has 4 paired jetbridges and 2 single jetbridges. Hang Nadim International Airport is a hub for Lion Air, Batik Air and Citilink. BP Batam, which operates Hang Nadim International Airport, will build a new terminal with a capacity of eight million passengers per year for each terminal (16 million passengers per year in total for two terminals) in late 2016. BP Batam intends to build eight paired jetbridges in the new terminal. Domestic destinations include Pekanbaru, Palembang, Medan, Jakarta, Padang, Surabaya, Bandung, Bandar Lampung, Balikpapan, Yogyakarta, Makassar, and many more. International flights currently include Kuala Lumpur, Malaysia (operated by Batik Air Malaysia).

Environment 
Due to piling works for touristic activity, sand mining, and logging for charcoal business, only 4.2% of Batam Island is covered in mangrove forests, a great decrease from 24% in 1970. Originally, Batam Island had 41,500 hectares of mangrove forests.

Gallery

See also 

 List of tallest buildings in Batam

References

External links 

 
 
Batam Ferry Terminal Official site 
Statistics of Batam Municipality

 
Cities in Indonesia
Special economic zones
Populated places in Riau